The third season of the American television series Tough as Nails premiered on CBS on October 6, 2021, and concluded on December 8, 2021. The season was won by jill-of-all-trades Lia Mort, with diesel mechanic Dequincey "Quincey" Walker finishing second, and heavy equipment operator Jerome Kupuka'a placing third.

Cast

Future appearances
Dequincey "Quincey" Walker appeared on the fourth season during the automotive service challenges of the fourth episode. Lamar Edwin Hanger appeared on the fourth season during the construction challenges of the seventh episode.

Cast progress

 The contestant won Tough as Nails.
 The contestant was declared the first runner-up.
 The contestant was declared the second runner-up.
 The contestant placed the highest in the individual competition and won the challenge.
 The contestant placed the second highest in the individual competition and was ultimately declared safe.
 The contestant was safe from elimination.
 The contestant placed the second lowest in the individual competition but was ultimately declared safe.
 The contestant placed the lowest in the individual competition and competed in the overtime challenge but ultimately survived.
 The contestant was the loser of the overtime challenge and was eliminated from the individual competition.

Team progress

 Won the team challenge.
 Lost the team challenge.

Production
On April 14, 2021, CBS announced that Tough as Nails was renewed for a third and a fourth season. On June 7, Phil Keoghan revealed on the show's social media that filming had begun at Marine Corps Base Camp Pendleton. The contestants also competed at Mount Baldy, the United States Coast Guard Base in San Pedro, and the Irwindale Speedway. On July 12, 2021, it was announced that the season would premiere on October 6, 2021.

Episodes

References

2021 American television seasons
Tough as Nails